Rivand may refer to:
 Rivand, Davarzan
 Rivand, Rashtkhvar
 Rivand Rural District